São Bernardo is a civil parish in Aveiro Municipality, Aveiro District, Portugal. The population in 2011 was 4,960, in an area of 3.94 km2.

Sport
The handball club São Bernardo, which has participated several times in the first level national championship is located in this town.

References

Freguesias of Aveiro, Portugal